Jerome Deupree (born November 9, 1956) is an American musician, based in Massachusetts.  He is best known as the original drummer in the alternative rock band Morphine.

Early career
Deupree started playing drums at the age of six, with the help of his two older brothers. In the early 1970s he formed a band with his brother Jesse. After high school, he moved to Bloomington, Indiana, where he got to record for the first time. After a few years he again relocated to Santa Cruz, California, where he played with Humans, who toured with Squeeze and opened for Patti Smith and Iggy Pop.

In 1981 he moved to Boston, and has lived there since. His early Boston projects included stints in Sex Execs and Either/Orchestra.

Morphine
In the late 1980s, songwriter Mark Sandman suggested that the two jam with saxophone player Dana Colley.  As Morphine, the three composed material and performed throughout the East Coast, including shows in New York. They also recorded at Q Division Studios and The Outpost. In 1991 Deupree was forced to leave the project temporarily due to pain in his hand. Billy Conway took his place during that period.

He returned to the band in 1992 and played on the debut album Good. The band also toured through California. Although the project was successful, Deupree had personal differences with Sandman, and he decided to leave the band at the end of 1992.

Soon after that, Sandman called him and asked him to take part in a demo session that ended up being the band's second album, Cure for Pain.

In 1998 he made some appearances with Morphine, playing along with drummer Conway, shortly before Sandman died while performing in Italy in 1999, ending the band suddenly.

Post-Morphine projects
After Sandman's death, Colley, Conway, and Deupree formed the band Orchestra Morphine to tour behind Morphine's posthumous final album, The Night. Orchestra Morphine remained sporadically active thereafter, reassembling occasionally to perform Morphine material.

Deupree played frequently with jazz guitarist Joe Morris, appearing on several recordings.  He participated in a formative version of the band Beat Circus in 2002, and joined the Boston group Bourbon Princess for an extended time.  He has also appeared as a session musician on records by Eric Hutchinson, Merrie Amsterburg, Jen Trynin, and James McMurtry.

In 2009, Colley and Deupree began playing with New Orleans musician Jeremy Lyons as Members of Morphine, later renamed Vapors of Morphine.  This trio performs classic Morphine songs and new material. Jerome left Vapors of Morphine in 2019.

Discography

With Either/Orchestra
The Half-Life of Desire (Accurate, 1990)

References

External links
Official Website 
Vapors of Morphine at Facebook
Vapors of Morphine's Official Website

Living people
Musicians from Cincinnati
Musicians from Ohio
1956 births
Either/Orchestra members
Morphine (band) members